James C. Russell Sr., known as Jay Russell (November 4, 1928 – February 24, 2016), was an American politician who served in the Missouri House of Representatives. Russell was born in St. Louis and attended the University of Missouri in Columbia. A veteran of the United States Marine Corps, he owned BJ's Bar and Restaurant in Florissant in St. Louis County.

On June 11, 1955, he wed the former Delphie Mann in Pine Lawn, also in St. Louis County. There are two surviving children, including James Russell Jr. He was elected to the Missouri House in 1962. At various times because of redistricting, he represented Districts 1, 25, 58, and 75. He served as a Democrat until 1988. Russell died on February 24, 2016, having been diagnosed with skin cancer six months prior.

References

1928 births
2016 deaths
Politicians from St. Louis
Businesspeople from Missouri
Democratic Party members of the Missouri House of Representatives
University of Missouri alumni
United States Marines
Deaths from cancer in Missouri
Deaths from skin cancer
20th-century American businesspeople